Sarisophora melanotata is a moth in the family Lecithoceridae. It was described by Kyu-Tek Park in 2012. It is found in Papua New Guinea.

Etymology
The species name  derived from the Greek word melan, meaning black.

References

Moths described in 2012
Sarisophora